The men's 100 metres (T38) at the 2018 Commonwealth Games, as part of the athletics programme, took place in the Carrara Stadium on 9 April 2018. The event was open to para-sport athletes competing under the T37 / T38 classifications.

Records
Prior to this competition, the existing world records were as follows:

Schedule
The schedule was as follows:

All times are Australian Eastern Standard Time (UTC+10)

Results
With eight entrants, the event was held as a straight final.

Final

References

Men's 100 metres (T38)